These are the official results of the Men's Discus Throw event at the 1997 World Championships in Athens, Greece. There were a total number of 42 participating athletes, with the final held on Sunday August 10, 1997. The qualification mark was set at 63.00 metres.

Medalists

Schedule
All times are Eastern European Time (UTC+2)

Abbreviations
All results shown are in metres

Qualification

Final

See also
 1994 Men's European Championships Discus Throw (Helsinki)
 1996 Men's Olympic Discus Throw (Atlanta)
 1998 Men's European Championships Discus Throw (Budapest)

References
 Results

D
Discus throw at the World Athletics Championships